The Strange Marchioness (Spanish:La marquesona) is a 1940 Spanish musical film directed by Eusebio Fernández Ardavín and starring Mary del Río, Fernando Fresno, Miguel García Morcillo. It was based on a play by Pascual Guillén and Antonio Quintero. The film was made by Spain's leading studio Cifesa.

Cast
 Mary del Río 
 Fernando Fresno 
 Miguel García Morcillo
 Pastora Imperio 
 Francisco Muñoz 
 Nicolás D. Perchicot 
 Luchy Soto 
 Jesús Tordesillas

References

Bibliography
 Bentley, Bernard. A Companion to Spanish Cinema. Boydell & Brewer 2008.

External links 

1940 films
Spanish musical films
1940 musical films
1940s Spanish-language films
Films directed by Eusebio Fernández Ardavín
Spanish films based on plays
Spanish black-and-white films
1940s Spanish films